The Women's 100 metres (T37) at the 2010 Commonwealth Games as part of the athletics programme was held at the Jawaharlal Nehru Stadium on Thursday 7 October 2010.

Results

External links
2010 Commonwealth Games - Athletics

Women's 100 metres (T37)
2010 in women's athletics